Norak District or Nohiya-i Norak is a former district in Khatlon Region, Tajikistan. Its capital was Norak. Around 2018, it was merged into the city of Norak.

Administrative divisions
The district was divided administratively into jamoats. They are as follows (and population).

References

Districts of Khatlon Region
Former districts of Tajikistan